Nurtas Kurgulin (born 20 September 1986 in Taraz) is a Kazakh international footballer who plays for FC Taraz, as a midfielder.

Career
In December 2016, Kurgulin left FC Tobol.

Career statistics

International

Statistics accurate as of match played 5 June 2012

References

External links
 
 

1986 births
Living people
Kazakhstani footballers
Kazakhstan international footballers
Kazakhstan Premier League players
FC Taraz players
FC Tobol players
Association football midfielders
People from Taraz